Potin (also known as billon) is a base metal silver-like alloy used in coins. It is typically a mixture of copper, tin and lead (in varying proportions) and it is debated whether any actual silver needs to be present. While the term billon is more commonly applied to ancient Roman coinage, potin is usually used for Greek or Celtic coinage.

Use in Celtic coinage

In 1890, so-called Potin lumps were found, of which the largest weighs , at the Prehistoric pile dwelling settlement Alpenquai in Zürich (Vicus Turicum) in Switzerland. The pieces consist of a large number of fused Celtic coins, which are mixed with charcoal remnants. Some of the about 18,000 coins originate from the Eastern Gaul, and others are of the Zürich type, that were assigned to the local Helvetii, which date to around 100 BC. The find is so far unique, and the scientific research assumes that the melting down of the lump was not completed, therefore the aim was to form cult offerings.

Kentish cast bronzes (historically referred to as Thurrock potins)  appear to have been the first coins made in Britain dating from the end of the second century BC. They appear to have circulated mainly in Kent and were based on coins issued by Massalia (now Marseille).

See also
 Tin coinage

References

Precious metal alloys
Numismatic terminology
Silver
Coinage metals and alloys